In England, netball has been popular enough to be included as part of the physical education curriculum. Its inclusion had been at times controversial; during the 1910s and 1920s, schools worried about the potential negative impact of physical exercise like netball participation on the health of girls.

Below is a list including some of the top performances for the English national netball team:
 1998 Commonwealth Games: 3rd place
 2002 Commonwealth Games: 4th place
 2005 World Youth Netball Championship: 2nd place
 2018 Commonwealth Games: 1st place

As of August 2016, the women's national team was ranked number three in the world.

References

Bibliography

 
 
 
 

 
Articles containing video clips